A phase in combat is usually a period within a military operation of a longer duration that is a part of a serial chain of logically connected activities planned to culminate in a defined objective or goal. 

A phase is usually marked by achievement of significant intermediary objectives, such as tactical within an engagement. A phase may be either limited by time allocated for its execution, or unlimited in time, and defined only by achievement of the objective. 

At the strategic level, a phase continue for years. Not all phases of combat include fighting between armed forces. Phases can, and usually do overlap, and sometimes can be planned for parallel execution, often as part of deception planning. 

Phases typically found in offensive military operations are:

Preparation
 Intelligence gathering phase
 Operations planning phase
 Logistics management phase
 Deception and counterintelligence phase
 Assembly phase
Conduct
 Initial (combat assault) phase
 Breakthrough phase
Exploitation
 Follow-on (support) phase
 Pursuit phase
 Objective security phase
 Position consolidation phase
 Defensive phase
 Reorganisation phase
 A lull in combat (usually unplanned)
Stability
 Enable civil authorities

Citations and notes

References

Military theory
Military strategy
Military tactics